is a Japanese-born Australian former professional baseball pitcher who played for the Minnesota Twins and Toronto Blue Jays of Major League Baseball (MLB) and the Hokkaido Nippon-Ham Fighters, Yomiuri Giants and Saitama Seibu Lions of Nippon Professional Baseball (NPB).

He was educated at the Knox School and Wesley College, Melbourne.

Career
Nakamura was born to an Australian mother and Japanese father. The family moved to Australia when he was 3 years old, and Nakamura later moved to the United States after signing with the Minnesota Twins in 1997. Despite having participated on the Australian Olympic baseball team in 1996 and 2000, Nakamura was not successful in Major League Baseball; he pitched in only 31 games from 2003 to 2004, and never recorded a win. He was traded to the Toronto Blue Jays in 2004, and was not re-signed for the next season. On July 27, 2004, Nakamura surrendered Gary Sheffield's 400th career home run.

After being cut from the majors, Nakamura sought opportunities in Japan and was drafted in the 4th round of the 2004 draft by the Hokkaido Nippon-Ham Fighters, and  he debuted against the Seibu Lions on March 29, 2005. He was injured halfway through the year, but ended with a record of 3-0 and a 2.31 ERA over 32 games. He struck out more batters than innings pitched, and did not give up a single run in the second half of the season.

In his second year Nakamura made 39 saves, setting a new Pacific League single-season record, and the Fighters won the Japanese championship series. Nakamura pitched in four Japanese championship series games, and did not give up a single hit. He has since been traded from the Fighters and signed for the Yomiuri Giants.

Nakamura retired as a member of the Saitama Seibu Lions after the conclusion of the 2012 season.

International career
Nakamura represented Australia at the 1996 Summer Olympics in Atlanta and 2000 Summer Olympics in Sydney. He had four appearances out of the bullpen in Atlanta and three appearances in Sydney games.

Pitching style
Nakamura throws sidearm and relies mostly on two types of curves and a fastball around 90 mph. One of his curves has a movement resembling a slider (some commentators have called it a slurve), while the other has a wide break.

References

External links

1976 births
Living people
Australian Christians
Australian expatriate baseball players in Canada
Australian expatriate baseball players in the United States
Baseball coaches
Baseball people from Nara Prefecture
Baseball players at the 1996 Summer Olympics
Baseball players at the 2000 Summer Olympics
Edmonton Trappers players
Hokkaido Nippon-Ham Fighters players
Japanese Christians
Japanese expatriate baseball players in Canada
Japanese expatriate baseball players in the United States
Japanese emigrants to Australia
Japanese people of Australian descent
Major League Baseball pitchers
Major League Baseball players from Australia
Major League Baseball players from Japan
Minnesota Twins players
Olympic baseball players of Australia
People educated at Wesley College (Victoria)
Nippon Professional Baseball pitchers
Saitama Seibu Lions players
People from Nara, Nara
Toronto Blue Jays players
Yomiuri Giants players